Bobby Payne is a Republican member of the Florida Legislature representing the state's 19th House district.

Career
Payne defeated two other candidates to win the August 30, 2016 Republican primary, winning 42.1% of the vote. In the November 8, 2016 general election, Payne easily defeated Democrat Joe Snodgrass, taking 72.5% of the vote.

Payne won re-election in 2018, defeating Democrat Paul Still with 73.4% of the vote.

References

Payne, Bobby
Living people
21st-century American politicians
Jacksonville University alumni
Nova Southeastern University alumni
People from Palatka, Florida
1958 births